Antimonide iodides or iodide antimonides are compounds containing anions composed of iodide (I−) and antimonide (Sb3−). They can be considered as mixed anion compounds. They are in the category of pnictide halides. Related compounds include the antimonide chlorides, antimonide bromides, phosphide iodides, and arsenide iodides.

List

References

Antimonides
Iodides
Mixed anion compounds